Melania Gabbiadini (born 28 August 1983) is an Italian former football forward. After beginning her career with Bergamo in 2000, she later joined AGSM Verona in 2004 and went on to captain the team, until her retirement in 2017. She won five Scudetti with the club.

A fast winger, with an eye for goal, Gabbiadini was an experienced player at international level, who made over 100 caps for the Italy women's national football team. She is a veteran of Italy's 2005, 2009, 2013, and 2017 UEFA Women's Championship campaigns, being voted to the Squad of the Tournament in the 2013 edition of the tournament. She was voted the Serie A Female Footballer of the Year in 2012, 2013, 2014, and 2015, and was inducted into the Italian Football Hall of Fame in 2016.

Club career 
Gabbiadini began her career with Bergamo in 2000, winning the Serie B title with the club in 2002. After the club's bankruptcy in 2004, she moved to AGSM Verona, the club with which she remained until her retirement in 2017. With Bardolino Verona, she won the Serie A title during the 2004–05, 2006–07, 2007–08, 2008–09, and 2014–15 seasons, as well as the Coppa Italia during the 2005–06, and 2006–07 seasons, and the Supercoppa italiana in 2005, 2007, and 2008; she was also voted the Serie A Female Footballer of the Year in 2012, 2013, 2014, and 2015. With Verona, she also reached the semi-finals of the 2007–08 UEFA Women's Cup.

International career 

After representing her country at under-21 level on 5 occasions, Gabbiadini made her senior debut for Italy on 16 April 2003, in a 5–0 away friendly win over the Netherlands. Included in the squad for UEFA Women's Euro 2005 in North West England, she scored twice in a 5–3 defeat to Norway as Italy made a group stage exit.

At UEFA Women's Euro 2009 in Finland, Gabbiadini played in all four games and scored in a 2–0 win over Russia as the Italians reached the quarter-finals. Four years later, national coach Antonio Cabrini named Gabbiadini in his selection for UEFA Women's Euro 2013 in Sweden. After scoring two goals in the group stage against Denmark and hosts Sweden, she played the entire match in the Italians' 1–0 quarter-final defeat to perennial champions Germany. She was voted to the Squad of the Tournament for her performances.

On 16 February 2016, ahead of the 2016 UEFA Women's Champions League Final media launch held in Reggio Emilia, she was awarded a commemorative cap and medal by UEFA for having obtained over 100 caps for the Italian national team. In November 2016, she was included in Italy's squad for the 2016 International Women's Football Tournament of Manaus, which was held from 7 to 18 December.

She retired after the UEFA Women's Euro 2017. However, she finished her international career with 114 appearances and 45 goals.

Style of play 

A quick forward and a prolific goalscorer, Gabbiadini was known for her technical ability and her pace on the ball, and was often deployed as a winger or as a main striker. She also stood out for her leadership and work-rate throughout her career.

Personal life 

As well as being a footballer, Gabbiadini is a tattoo designer. Her younger brother Manolo plays as a forward for Sampdoria and has represented the Italy men's national team.

Gabbiadini's participation at UEFA Women's Euro 2017 was widely noted by Dutch viewers due to her striking resemblance to former professional footballer Wim Kieft, who coincidentally played in the Italian Serie A around the time of her conception. Television show Voetbal Inside mentioned this and jokingly questioned whether he would be her actual father.

Honours

Club 
AGSM Verona
Serie A: 2004–05, 2006–07, 2007–08, 2008–09, 2014–15
Coppa Italia: 2005–06, 2006–07
Supercoppa italiana: 2005, 2007, 2008

Bergamo
Serie B: 2001–02

Individual 
Serie A Female Footballer of the Year: 2012, 2013, 2014, 2015 
UEFA Women's Euro 2013 Squad of the Tournament
Italian Football Hall of Fame: 2016
Pallone Azzurro: 2016

References

External links 
 
 
 Verona player profile

1983 births
Living people
Italian women's footballers
Italy women's international footballers
Serie A (women's football) players
A.S.D. AGSM Verona F.C. players
Sportspeople from the Province of Bergamo
Women's association football forwards
FIFA Century Club
People from Calcinate
Footballers from Lombardy
UEFA Women's Euro 2017 players